Rajim is a town which is proposed to be in Raipur district but officially in Gariaband district, Chhattisgarh, India. Rajim is named after Rajiv Lochan Mandir which is the Main Hindu Pilgrimage Temple of Rajim dedicated to Vishnu. There is also the Ancient Kuleshwar Mahadev Mandir dedicated Shiva in the Triveni Sangam. The town hosts the Triveni Sangam of Mahanadi, Pairi (Physically) & Sondor (Virtually). Being of so many importance, Rajim is also called the Prayag of Chhattisgarh. It was also the center of work of great freedom fighter and social reformer Pt. Sundarlal Sharma.

Geography
It is located at an elevation of 281 m above MSL.

Location
Rajim is 45 km from Raipur. To reach there, one needs to take National Highway 43 to Abhanpur; from there a left turn leads a narrow but motorable road to Rajim. Other. Nearby important city is Mahasamund which is only 25 km far on the junction of National Highway 6 and National Highway 353 and which has an important railway station in Raipur–Vizianagarm Railway line. The nearest airport is Raipur Airport and the nearest railway station is Gobra Nawapara (Rajim) railway station which is in narrow-gauge line.

Tourism
The holy confluence of three rivers Mahanadi (Chitrotpala), Pairi and Sondur, called Triveni Sangam is at Rajim. Rajim is also known as the "Prayag of the Chhattisgarh".

Temples
Rajim is famous for its rich cultural heritage and ancient temples.

Rajiv Lochan Vishnu Mandir 
The Rajiv Lochan Vishnu Mandir is an ancient Vishnu temple located at Rajim. A 7th century CE inscription recording the construction of the temple, and dated to the reign of the king Vilasatunga, has been found here. Vilasatunga probably belonged to a branch of the Nala dynasty.

This temple is a notable example of Panchayana Shaili (Architect) The temple structure is supported by twelve towered columns embroidered with stone carvings, which bear the faces of the various gods of the Hindu mythology. The temple is an important religious construct visited by devotees from all over the globe who arrive to offer their prayers to the Lord Vishnu. The statue of Lord Buddha in the meditative position under the Bodhi tree carved out of black stone is also popular in the city.

Subsidiary Temples 
Other temples dedicated to the various incarnations of Lord Vishnu like the Vamana and the Narasimha are in close proximity of the Rajiv Lochan Mandir.

Kuleshwar Mahadeva Mandir 
The Kuleshwar Mahadeva Mandir stands in glory in the city even in itate.

Ghatoria Mahakali Mandir
The Ghatoria Mahakali Mandir is another temple on the banks of Mahanadi river.

bhagvan parashvanath temple:-
this temple has been made before 15 years back, when few people found a 2000 old year parshavanatha bhagwan's statue.

Festivals
Rajim Kumbh is celebrated every year during mid-Feb to March spread over a span of 15 days. Rajim Kumbh attracts thousands of Naga Sadhus, Sants, Mahatmas, Rishis, Munis and Margdarshak Gurus from across India and beyond. The Rajim Kumbh is arranged at the confluence of three rivers in Rajim also known as Triveni Sangam. Within the same festival, an event Rajim Lochan Mahotsav is held between 16 February and 1 March. The various music and dance performances conducted in the fair displays the rich culture of Rajim.

References

External links
 Rajim Tour
 About Rajim

Cities and towns in Raipur district
Religious buildings and structures in Chhattisgarh